Amla may refer to:

 Indian gooseberry, called amla in Hindi and called "आवळा" in Marathi language
 Hashim Amla (born 1983), South African cricketer of Indian descent
 Ahmed Amla (born 1979), South African cricketer and brother of Hashim
 Amla, Madhya Pradesh, a town in Madhya Pradesh, India
 Amla (Vidhan Sabha constituency), Madhya Pradesh

See also
 AMLA (disambiguation)
 Amlah, Oman